Valto Rudolf Olenius (12 December 1920 in Karkkila – 13 July 1983 in Heinola) was a Finnish pole vaulter who competed in the 1948 Summer Olympics and in the 1952 Summer Olympics.

References

1920 births
1983 deaths
Finnish male pole vaulters
Olympic athletes of Finland
Athletes (track and field) at the 1948 Summer Olympics
Athletes (track and field) at the 1952 Summer Olympics
European Athletics Championships medalists
People from Karkkila
Sportspeople from Uusimaa